The Tate Institute was a community facility established by Henry Tate in Silvertown in 1887.

The building was established to create an apolitical and non-sectarian environment. The Institute closed in 1933 and the building was used as a local library until 1961.

The institute was boarded up in 2011, but in April 2016 a group of artists took over the building establishing the "Craftory", to rehabilitate the building and create the “Silvertown ArtSpace” to provide a hub for a broad range of artistic and community activities.

References

Buildings and structures in the London Borough of Newham
Buildings and structures completed in 1887